Scott Spiegel (born December 10, 1957) is an American screenwriter, film director, producer and actor. He co-wrote the screenplay for the movie Evil Dead II with longtime friend, film director Sam Raimi, with whom he attended Wylie E. Groves High School in Birmingham, Michigan. Spiegel played the role of Scotty in Raimi's Within the Woods, which served as a precursor to The Evil Dead, where Spiegel was replaced by Richard DeManincor (Hal Delrich).

Early life
Spiegel grew up in Birmingham, Michigan.  He attended Walnut Lake Elementary school and then went on to attend West Maple Jr. High School.  It was here that Scott met Sam Raimi and Bruce Campbell.  Spiegel worked at the local grocery market across from Walnut Lake Elementary School.

Career
When Spiegel first moved to Los Angeles, he shared a house with film directors Raimi, Joel Coen and Ethan Coen and actresses Holly Hunter, Frances McDormand and Kathy Bates. He shared yet another house with roommate and film editor Bob Murawski (Spider-Man). In the early 1990s, he introduced film director Quentin Tarantino to producer Lawrence Bender, who helped Tarantino get Reservoir Dogs made.

In 1999, Spiegel directed the direct-to-video sequel From Dusk Till Dawn 2: Texas Blood Money. Spiegel formed the production company Raw Nerve with film directors Eli Roth, and Boaz Yakin. Raw Nerve produced the film Hostel (2005), directed by Roth.

He was also the executive producer of the film Cain Hill, which was released in 2017 and starring Gemma Atkinson, Michael Parr and Tony Cook.

Filmography

Collaborations

References

External links

1957 births
Horror film directors
People from Birmingham, Michigan
Living people
Film directors from Michigan
Screenwriters from Michigan